Omniscient Interfering View is a South Korean television entertainment program, distributed and syndicated by MBC Saturdays at 11:05 pm (KST) since 10 March 2018.

On 18 April 2020, the show celebrated its 100th episode since debut. On 21 May 2022, the show celebrated its 200th episode.

Synopsis
Omniscient Interfering View is an observational entertainment show that uses a documentary style techniques to observe the life of the cast members, invited guests and their managers. The show follows another program, I Live Alone of a similar format, which airs on the same channel on Fridays at the same time slot.

Similar program, On & Off, produced by tvN is a show of personal documentary, where celebrities share their "On" (busy working daily life) and/or "Off" (private/at home) moments of their lives.

History
Between episode 1 and 10, the cast members, a behavioral analysis expert, and occasionally guests, watch the videos in a studio setting and provide commentary.

From episode 11 onward, the format has changed slightly to invite guests with their managers. The cast members and invited guests watch the videos as they observe and comment on the life of the invited guests and their managers. Occasionally the cast members and their managers are also observed and commented.

Airtime

Cast

Pilot episode
For the two pilot episodes aired on 29 and 30 November 2017, the cast consisted of Jun Hyun-moo, Lee Young-ja, Song Eun-i, Yang Se-hyung, Seo Min (parasite doctor), Lee Jai-jin and Yang Jae-woong (psychiatrist). Seo Min and Lee Jai-jin were replaced by the time the show started its proper run.

Current cast/interferer

Former cast/interferer

Long-term guest appearances
List of long-term guests since episode 11.

Current

None

Former

Episodes

2018

2019

2020

2021

2022

2023

Ratings

2018

 There are two ratings for each episode, as the show airs in two parts.

2019

 There are two ratings for each episode, as the show airs in two parts.

2020

The show will be aired in two parts. Only the higher rating of the episode will be shown.

2021

The show will be aired in two parts. Only the higher rating of the episode will be shown.

2022

2023

Awards and nominations

Controversies

2018

Kim Saeng-min
On 2 April, Korean media outlet Dispatch broke a story about Kim Saeng-min harassing two female staff members at a party in 2008. One of the afflicted staff members received an apology in 2008, whilst the other spoke about trying to raise the issue, but being slowly pushed out of the program by other staff members, before she eventually quit her job as a staff member on the program.

Upon being contacted by Dispatch regarding the story, Kim Saeng-min apologized to the former staff member, and later released an official apology through his agency. He then withdrew from all of his current TV and radio programs, including Omniscient Interfering View.

Fishcake controversy
During the 5 May broadcast, the show used a censored clip from MBC News coverage of the Sewol Ferry disaster with the headline "Lee Young-ja makes shocking confession while eating fish cakes". This sparked a controversy, as users of the controversial online community Ilbe had used the term "fish cakes" to refer to the victims of the Ferry disaster. Both the production staff and the MBC president immediately apologized, and launched an internal investigation of the issue. The program was temporarily halted, and went off-air for 7 weeks before returning to air on 30 June 2018.

2019

Fraud case
During the 20 July broadcast, the show display a subtitle notice to alert the audiences that "the production team does not ask for money with the filming". During the recent production, someone has been masquerading as a supporter for money and the production is requesting to avoid, and be careful as the production crew will never ask for money.

Notes

See also
I Live Alone
On & Off

References

External links
 

2020s South Korean television series
Korean-language television shows
MBC TV original programming
South Korean variety television shows
South Korean reality television series
2018 South Korean television series debuts